Haydée Padilla (15 November 1936 – 14 December 2022) was an Argentine actress. She appeared in more than forty films from 1965 to 2019.

Padilla died on 14 December 2022, at the age of 86.

Selected filmography

References

External links 

1936 births
2022 deaths
20th-century Argentine actresses
Actresses from Buenos Aires
Argentine film actresses
Argentine television actresses
Argentine stage actresses